Mukhtar Rabatuly Aymakhanov (Mūhtar Rabatūly Aimahanov; born January 1, 1967, in Zhosaly, Kazakhstan) is a Russian cosmonaut; he was originally a Kazakhstani cosmonaut.

Kazakh cosmonaut career
Aimakhanov and Aidyn Aimbetov were selected as the first class of Kazakh cosmonauts in 2002, for the Kazakhstan National Space Agency, KazCosmos. They trained at Star City as cosmonauts from 2003 to 2009, until the world financial crisis indefinitely postponed the prospective Kazakhstan mission.

The Kazakh mission finally took place in September 2015 aboard Soyuz TMA-18M after prospective Space tourist Sarah Brightman pulled out from the flight. Aimbetov flew with Russian cosmonaut Sergey Prokopyev as his backup since Aymakhanov had already left KazCosmos and joined Roscosmos by the time of the flight.

On December 28, 2022, he left the position of a test cosmonaut in the Roscosmos cosmonaut squad after the decision of the Main Medical Commission. He will continue to work at the Gagarin Cosmonaut Training Center as a leading specialist in cosmonaut training.

Russian cosmonaut career
In 2012, to pursue his cosmonaut dreams, Aymakhanov became a Russian citizen, and gave up his Kazakhstani citizenship.

References

External links
Spacefacts biography of Mukhtar Aymakhanov

1967 births
Living people
Kazakhstani cosmonauts
Russian cosmonauts
Russian people of Kazakhstani descent
People from Kyzylorda Region